Gustav Stolper (25 July 1888 – 27 December 1947) was an Austrian-German economist, economics journalist and politician.

Life and work
Stolper was born into a Jewish family that had immigrated from Poland to Austria.

In 1913 he established Der Österreichischer Volkswirt. In 1926 he established the  Deutscher Volkswirt, the forerunner of Wirtschaftswoche weekly business magazine.

Stolper was elected to the Reichstag of the Weimar Republic in 1930 as a member of the German State Party.

Gustav Stolper Prize
The Gustav Stolper Prize is awarded by the Verein für Socialpolitik for "outstanding scientists who have employed the findings of economic research to influence the public debate on economic issues and problems, and have made important contributions to understanding and solving contemporary economic problems."

Winners:
 2007: Bruno S. Frey
 2008: Hans-Werner Sinn
 2009: Martin Hellwig
 2010: Ernst Fehr
 2011: Otmar Issing
 2012: Wolfgang Franz
 2013: Clemens Fuest
 2014: Carl Christian von Weizsäcker
 2015: Justus Haucap
 2016: Christoph M. Schmidt
 2017: Ludger Wößmann
 2018: Isabel Schnabel
 2019: Ulrike Malmendier
 2020: Markus Brunnermeier
 2021: Lars Feld
 2022: Monika Schnitzer

Family
His eldest son Wolfgang Stolper (1912-2002) was an American economist.

See also
 Einstein–Szilárd letter

References

External links

 

1888 births
1947 deaths
Politicians from Vienna
Jewish German politicians
German Democratic Party politicians
German State Party politicians
Members of the Reichstag of the Weimar Republic
Austrian economists
German economists
Jewish emigrants from Nazi Germany to the United States